Jo Durie and Jill Hetherington were the defending champions in 1990, but none competed this year.

Patty Fendick and Meredith McGrath won the title by defeating Nicole Arendt and Kristine Radford 6–4, 6–1 in the final.

Seeds

Draw

References

External links
 Official results archive (ITF)

Singapore doubles
WTA Singapore Open
1994 in Singaporean sport